Stanley Ralph Ross (July 22, 1935  – March 16, 2000) was an American writer and actor. He was raised in Brooklyn, New York, starting his career in advertising with Chudacoff and Margulis Advertising in West Los Angeles, then soon going to work as a writer on various television shows such as the 1960s Batman series starring Adam West and also The Monkees, and developed Wonder Woman for television with Douglas S. Cramer. Ross was sometimes credited as Sue Donem, a pun on "pseudonym".

Career
In 1958, Ross teamed with Bob Arbogast to write and record the novelty record "Chaos, parts 1 and 2".  When it came out (on Liberty Records), it sold 10,000 copies in three days and then was banned from radio play on the fourth day - when stations realized that it satirized "Top 40" radio.  Dr Demento has kept "Chaos" alive.  They later co-wrote an album of parody songs titled My Son, the Copycat (a parody of Allan Sherman's albums) and the book Speak When You Hear the Beep.

In 1977, Ross was awarded the Inkpot Award.

Actor
John Goldfarb, Please Come Home (1964) as Muezzin (uncredited)
The Flight of the Phoenix (1965) as Arab Singer (uncredited)
Sleeper (1973) as Sears Wiggles
Candy Stripe Nurses (1974) as Dr. Kramer
Helter Skelter (1976, TV Mini-Series) as Sgt. Ross
Romantic Comedy (1983)
The Boss' Wife (1986) as Ticket Taker
Side Out (1990) as Judge McKibbon
 HeartPower! Sing-Along (1996) Tobacco Man
An Alan Smithee Film: Burn Hollywood Burn (1997) as Stanley Ralph Ross
Babe: Pig in the City (1998) as The Pitbull / The Doberman (voice) (final film role)

Screenwriter

Television
 The Man from U.N.C.L.E. (1966-1967)
 Batman (1966-1968)
 The Monkees (1967)
 That Girl (1967)
 Barefoot in the Park (1970)
 All in the Family (1971, 1973)
 Love, American Style (1972)
 The Mod Squad (1972)
 Banacek (1972-1973)
 Wait Till Your Father Gets Home (1973)
 Columbo (1973-1974)
 That’s My Mama (1975)
 Wonder Woman (1975-1979)
 The Kallikaks (1977)
 G.I. Joe: A Real American Hero (1985)
 Kids Incorporated (1985)
 Tales from the Crypt (1992)
 Burke’s Law (1995)

Films
The Wild Weird World of Dr. Goldfoot (1965) 
Coffee, Tea or Me? (1973)
 Gold of the Amazon Women (1979)

Television writing
Ross made his mark on television with writing.  As an ABC executive, he wrote (and directed) the classic opening segment to ABC's Wide World of Sports:

He wrote a third of the 1960s Batman episodes, and also had an uncredited cameo in one episode in which he played "Ballpoint Baxter."  The character had no lines.  Ballpoint was his nickname in real life.

Although most recognized for his work on Batman, Ross also wrote for The Monkees, All in the Family, Banacek, and G.I. Joe. He was the co-creator with Roger Price of the 1977 NBC situation comedy The Kallikaks and also wrote for the show.

Ross was involved in multiple efforts to bring the comic book character Wonder Woman to television.  Having been asked to write an alternative treatment for the Stan Hart and Larry Siegel 1967 proposal, Ross was later approached by producer Douglas S. Cramer in 1973 to write a series pilot.  Ross declined, objecting to the series' updated Wonder Woman character (based on the 1960s and 70s comic book) and the casting of Cathy Lee Crosby.  When the 1974 Crosby pilot failed, Ross was brought in to develop his own vision which put a high priority on visual fidelity to the look of the classic comics.  The resulting Wonder Woman aired from 1975 to 1979.  Ross was instrumental in the choosing of Lynda Carter and Lyle Waggoner as the show's stars.

Voice over work
Ross also was known for his distinctive voice and did much voiceover work.

He also did the voice of Gorilla Grodd on Challenge of the Super Friends and Super Friends cartoons, as well as taking over as Brainiac in Super Friends, Super Friends: The Legendary Super Powers Show and The Super Powers Team: Galactic Guardians, Perry White in the 1988 Superman cartoon, Dark Paw in Paw Paws, and has had numerous smaller parts (voice and acting) on television, movies, and over 1000 commercials.  One of his most notable on-screen TV roles would be as Mr. Graves on The Munsters Today.

He provided the voice for the Arab singer in the original version of The Flight of the Phoenix and was also the voice of the Doberman and Bull Terrier characters in the movie, Babe: Pig in the City.

His radio vignettes were heard on KFI, Los Angeles during 1973.

Audio books
In addition to his other work Ross also recorded audio books. Some of his recordings are A Book of the Five Rings based on the book of the same name by Musashi Miyamoto, Believe and Achieve based on the writings of Napoleon Hill and Awakening Your Mind Power, Channeling Your Higher Self, Explore Your Past Lives, Meditation and Self Hypnosis all based on the writings of Edgar Cayce.

Other work
Ross was also a songwriter, composing over 200 pieces, collaborating with such talent as Henry Mancini. He wrote "Beat the System," the theme song for The Kallikaks, which Roy Clark performed for the opening credits of the show in 1977. He also made a foray into musical theater, co-writing and co-composing the musical Love Is Spoken Here with Jacquelyn Reinach.

Wrote and produced “A Play With Fire” in Dundee, Scotland

Wrote the play Chaplin with Anthony Newley.  
He also taught at the University of Southern California film school.

In collaboration with Jay Robert Nash, Ross authored The Motion Picture Guide, a comprehensive multi-volume set of encyclopedias written from the 1970s to the early 1980s, containing detailed descriptions of possibly every motion picture made up to that time, with a two-volume index, and a separate volume entirely dedicated to silent films, and yet another listing every actor (and other major creative credit) with that person's complete list of films. The regular encyclopedia editions alphabetized every sound feature from 1927 until 1983, the last volume having a separate section in the back for 1984 movies (and the deaths of that year) that were compiled too close to press time to include alphabetically among the other listings; and starting in 1985 until the early 1990s, an individual volume was released annually, with an obituary section for that year also included. It used a five-star rating system, and was perhaps the most complete single project to catalog every movie until the creation of The Internet Movie Database (IMDb).

Ross became an ordained minister, marrying Burt Ward, who starred as Robin on the 1960s Batman series, to his third wife.

Death
Ross died of lung cancer on March 16, 2000, leaving behind a wife and three children. He was buried in Hillside Memorial Park Cemetery. His grave reads: Larger Than Life Beloved Son, Husband, Father, Grandfather STANLEY RALPH ROSS July 22, 1935 * March 16, 2000 "Thanks, I Had A Wonderful Time!"

References

External links

 
http://www.mtv.com/movies/person/54390/filmography.jhtml
http://www.quotationspage.com/quote/21861.html
http://www.emmytvlegends.org/interviews/people/stanley-ralph-ross

1935 births
2000 deaths
Male actors from New York City
American television writers
American male television writers
American male voice actors
Jewish American writers
Jewish American male actors
Writers from New York City
Deaths from lung cancer in California
Songwriters from New York (state)
Wide World of Sports (American TV series)
20th-century American male actors
20th-century American musicians
Burials at Hillside Memorial Park Cemetery
Inkpot Award winners
Screenwriters from New York (state)
20th-century American screenwriters
20th-century American male writers